"Down Down Down" is the debut single by English singer-songwriter Charlie Simpson, from his debut studio album Young Pilgrim (2011). It was released on 11 April 2011 as a digital download in the United Kingdom. The song peaked to the number 65 on the UK Singles Chart and number 9 on the UK Indie Chart.

Music video
A music video to accompany the release of "Down Down Down" was first released onto YouTube on 15 April 2011 at a total length of three minutes and twenty-three seconds. There is a storyline in the video and Charlie worked with the same people with next video for single 'Parachutes'.

Track listing

Chart performance

Release history

References

2011 singles
Charlie Simpson songs
Songs written by Charlie Simpson
2011 songs